The Ottoman wintering in Toulon occurred during the winter of 1543–44, following the Franco-Ottoman Siege of Nice, as part of the combined operations under the Franco-Ottoman alliance.

Wintering in Toulon
Francis offered to allow the Ottomans to winter at Toulon so that they could continue to harass the Holy Roman Empire, and especially the coast of Spain and Italy:

Only the heads of households were allowed to remain in the city, with the rest of the population having to leave, on pain of death. Francis I indemnified the inhabitants by exempting them from the taille tax for a period of 10 years.

During the wintering of Ottoman admiral Barbarossa, the Toulon Cathedral was transformed into a mosque, the call to prayer occurred five times a day, and Ottoman coinage was the currency of choice. According to an observer: "To see Toulon, one might imagine oneself at Constantinople".

Throughout the winter, the Ottomans were able to use Toulon as a base to attack the Spanish and Italian coasts under Admiral Salih Reis. They raided and bombarded Barcelona in Spain, and Sanremo, Borghetto Santo Spirito, Ceriale in the Republic of Genoa, and defeated Italo-Spanish naval attacks. Christian slaves were being sold in Toulon throughout the period.

Sailing with his whole fleet to Genoa, Barbarossa negotiated with Andrea Doria the release of Turgut Reis.

Barbarossa found the Toulon base very pleasant and convenient, could refit his ships at the expense of France, and could maintain an effective blockade of Christian shipping. The Lord Lieutenant of Provence complained about Barbarossa that "he takes his ease while emptying the coffers of France".

The Ottomans finally departed from their Toulon base after a stay of 8 months, on 23 May 1544, after Francis I had paid 800,000 ecus to Barbarossa. All Turkish and Barbary corsairs had to be freed from French galleys also, as a condition to his departure. Barbarossa also pillaged five French ships in the harbour of Toulon in order to provision his fleet.

Return to Constantinople

Five French galleys, under the command of the "Général des galères" Captain Polin, accompanied Barbarossa’s fleet, on a diplomatic mission to Sultan Suleiman. The French fleet accompanied Barbarossa during his attacks on the west coast of Italy on the way to Constantinople, as he laid waste to the cities of Porto Ercole, Giglio, Talamona, Lipari and took about 6,000 captives, but separated in Sicily from Barbarossa’s fleet to continue alone to the Ottoman capital.

This would be one of the last naval campaigns of Barbarossa, who died 2 years later in Constantinople in 1546.

Aftermath
Toulon would again be used as a safe harbour for several months by Turgut Reis from August 1546, when he was pursued by the fleet of Genoese admiral Andrea Doria.

Notes

References
 Roger Crowley, Empire of the sea, 2008 Faber & Faber 
 Yann Bouvier, « Récits de voyage et représentation de l'espace. La Méditerranée de Jérôme Maurand, un espace vécu », Mémoire de Master, Dir. par Pierre-Yves Beaurepaire, Université de Nice, 2007, 292 p. 
 Yann Bouvier, « Antoine Escalin des Aimars (1498?-1578) - De la Garde-Adhémar au siège de Nice, le parcours d'un Ambassadeur de François Ier », Recherches Régionales, Nice, Conseil Général des Alpes-Maritimes, n°188, Octobre-décembre 2007, 28 pp.

Naval history of the Ottoman Empire
Military history of France
Toulon
Islam in France
1540s in France
1543 in France
1544 in France
1543 in the Ottoman Empire
1544 in the Ottoman Empire
Italian Wars